Henry "Harry" Fallon (born 28 April 1942) is a Scottish former professional footballer who played as a goalkeeper in the Scottish Football League for St Johnstone, in the Football League for York City, in Scottish junior football for Neilston and in non-League football for Corby Town.

References

1942 births
Living people
Footballers from Paisley, Renfrewshire
Scottish footballers
Association football goalkeepers
St Johnstone F.C. players
York City F.C. players
Corby Town F.C. players
Scottish Football League players
English Football League players